Aziz Naser (born Aziz Janbaz) is an Indian actor, writer, voice artist and a director who works in Deccani and Telugu films. He worked in Hyderabadi films such as The Angrez and Hyderabad Nawabs. As a dubbing artist, he lent his voice for Sonu Sood, Nana Patekar, Kelly Dorjee, Aditya Pancholi, Rahul Dev and other Hindi film actors who featured in Telugu films.

Career
He has worked in more than 35 films in Deccani, Hindi, Telugu and Marathi. In 2015 he made his Telugu debut in movie Jyotilakhshmi. And in 2020, he made his debut in Marathi movie Stepney-Tumchaakde aahe ka..? as an actor, writer and director.

Filmography

Dubbing-Voiceover

See also
 Mast Ali

References

External links
 
 http://www.deccanchronicle.com/140515/entertainment-tollywood/article/voice-tollywood-villains

Indian male film actors
Male actors from Hyderabad, India
Living people
Male actors in Telugu cinema
Indian male voice actors
21st-century Indian male actors
1980 births